Farrukh Bari (born 4 September 1964) is a Pakistani former cricketer. He played 45 first-class and 29 List A matches for Pakistan National Shipping Corporation cricket team between 1987/88 and 1994/95.

See also
 List of Pakistan National Shipping Corporation cricketers

References

External links
 

1964 births
Living people
Pakistani cricketers
Pakistan National Shipping Corporation cricketers
Cricketers from Karachi